In aviation, the sterile flight deck rule or sterile cockpit rule is a procedural requirement that during critical phases of flight (normally below ), only activities required for the safe operation of the aircraft may be carried out by the flight crew, and all non-essential activities in the cockpit are forbidden. In the United States, the Federal Aviation Administration (FAA) imposed the rule in 1981, after reviewing a series of accidents that were caused by flight crews who were distracted from their flying duties by engaging in non-essential conversations and activities during critical parts of the flight.

One such accident was Eastern Air Lines Flight 212, which crashed just short of the runway at Charlotte/Douglas International Airport in 1974 while conducting an instrument approach in dense fog. The National Transportation Safety Board (NTSB) concluded that a probable cause of the accident was lack of altitude awareness due to distraction from idle chatter among the flight crew during the approach phase of the flight.

Historical background
In the early days of aviation, pilots had little chance to contemplate non-essential activities. Flying demanded constant attention, and the wind and engine noise in a slipstream-blasted open cockpit all but drowned out normal conversations. In the early years of instrument flying, the effort involved in "flying the beam" (navigating a course determined by the intersection of ground-based radio signals by straining to listen through a headset to a scratchy audio stream of "dits and dahs") also forced pilots to concentrate on flying duties during instrument meteorological conditions.

As aviation technology developed through the postwar period, increased comfort and sound reduction gradually created a more office-like environment, which is more conducive to distractions. Multi-person flight and cabin crews, autopilots, in-flight meals, newspaper service and other comforts further increased the availability and convenience of non-flight related activities for flight crews during flight time. The introduction of the Cockpit Voice Recorder as an objective onboard observer played an important role in the assessment of the problem during accident investigation by the NTSB, and eventual implementation of the rules by the FAA.

Operating requirements

United States
According to the US Federal Aviation Regulations (FAR), the rule is legally applicable only to Part 121 (Scheduled Air Carriers) and Part 135 (Commercial Operators), and not to Part 91 (non-commercial general aviation). It is specified in U.S. FAR 121.542/135.100, "Flight Crewmember Duties":

Note: Taxi is defined as "movement of an airplane under its own power on the surface of an airport".

Flight attendant and pilot communication
Research has shown that flight attendants, who must also observe the sterile flight deck rule, may be reluctant to call the flight deck while the rule is in effect, even during emergencies. For example:

The flight attendant at the door stated that she did not think of calling the cockpit when she heard the sound of the door leak before it separated, because the aircraft was under sterile cockpit conditions (Code of Federal Regulations, 1994). When queried as to what conditions she would call the cockpit when sterile, she responded that she would call in case of fire or a problem passenger. Confusion over, and rigid interpretation of, the sterile cockpit rule is not unusual as our studies have shown.

The FAA also noted that:
Many flight attendants do not have a clear understanding of what "sterile cockpit" means. Flight attendants need to be given specific information about what type of information merits contacting flight crewmembers during the sterile period. Hesitancy or reluctance on the part of a flight attendant to contact the flight crewmembers with important safety information because of a misconception of the sterile cockpit rule is potentially even more serious than the unnecessary distraction caused by needless violations of the sterile cockpit

Japan Airlines (JAL) took this a step further, describing in a flight attendant training manual several situations that would warrant flight-attendant-to-pilot communication during take-off and landing. Such situations included:
 Any outbreak of fire;
 The presence of smoke in the cabin;
 Any abnormality in the attitude of the aircraft during take-off and landing;
 The existence of any abnormal noise or vibration, and;
 The observance of any fuel or other leakages.
JAL also included guidance on when to make the calls to the pilots ("upon discovery of any abnormality"), what to call ("even [when] not absolutely sure, make the call") and how to call ("use the pilot call for emergency communication").

See also

Aviation safety
Controlled flight into terrain
Crew resource management
Distracted driving
 Crashes attributed to violation of the rule:
Widerøe Flight 710, 1988
Delta Air Lines Flight 1141, 1988
LAPA Flight 3142, 1999
Comair Flight 5191, 2006
Colgan Air Flight 3407, 2009
2010 Polish Air Force Tu-154 crash

References

Further reading
 

1981 in American law
Aviation law
Aviation safety
Code of Federal Regulations
Federal Aviation Administration